Makahiku Falls is a 200-foot (61m) horsetail waterfall in Haleakalā National Park on the island of Maui in Hawaii. It runs on the Ohe'o Gulch stream. The falls is accessed by the Pipiwai Trail.

Notes

Haleakalā National Park
Landforms of Maui
Waterfalls of Hawaii